The 2019 Nigerian Senate election in Gombe State was held on February 23, 2019, to elect members of the Nigerian Senate to represent Gombe State. Bulus Kilawangs Amos representing Gombe South, Mohammed Danjuma Goje representing Gombe Central and Sa'idu Ahmed Alkali representing Gombe North all won on the platform of All Progressives Congress.

Overview

Summary

Results

Gombe South 
A total of 11 candidates registered with the Independent National Electoral Commission to contest in the election. APC candidate Bulus Kilawangs Amos won the election, defeating PDP candidate, Binta Bello and 9 other party candidates. Amos scored 80,549 votes, while  PDP candidate Bello scored 63,312 votes.

Gombe Central 
A total of 13 candidates registered with the Independent National Electoral Commission to contest in the election. APC candidate Mohammed Danjuma Goje won the election, defeating PDP candidate Abubakar Nono and 11 other party candidates. Goje pulled 110,116 votes, while PDP candidate Nono scored 39,760.

Bauchi North 
A total of 18 candidates registered with the Independent National Electoral Commission to contest in the election. APC candidate Sa'idu Ahmed Alkali won the election, defeating PDP candidate and former Gombe Governor, Ibrahim Dakwambo and 16 other party candidates. Alkali pulled 152,546 votes while his closest rival Dakwambo pulled 88,016 votes.

References 

Gombe State senatorial elections